Kim Robertson is the name of

 Kim Robertson (athlete) (born 1957), New Zealand sprinter
 Kim Robertson (musician), American harpist